Roger Hugh Charles Donlon (born January 30, 1934) is a former United States Army officer. He is the first person to receive the Medal of Honor in the Vietnam War, as well as the first member of the United States Army Special Forces to be so honored.

Early life and education
Donlon was born in Saugerties, New York, the eighth child of ten. He attended the New York State College of Forestry at Syracuse University for a year. He joined the United States Air Force in 1953 and was admitted to West Point in 1955, but resigned for personal reasons. He re-enlisted, this time in the United States Army, in 1958, went to Officer Candidate School, and served as a general's aide. In August 1963 he joined the Special Forces. He earned a bachelor's degree from the University of Nebraska at Omaha in 1967.

Career

Early in the morning of July 6, 1964, the base was attacked by a large force of Vietcong. Under Captain Donlon's leadership, the two-battalion attack was repelled. Donlon received the Medal of Honor for his actions. Donlon later retired at the rank of colonel.

Donlon was awarded the key to the city of Lexington, Kentucky, by mayor Fred Fugazzi on June 28, 1965.

In 1965, Donlon received the Golden Plate Award of the American Academy of Achievement.

Donlon has written two books about his experiences in the Vietnam War: Outpost of Freedom and Beyond Nam Dong. He lives in Kansas with his wife Norma and children.

Medal of Honor citation
Rank and organization: Captain, U.S. Army. Place and date: Near Nam Dong, Republic of Vietnam, July 6, 1964. Entered service at: Fort Chaffee, Arkansas. Born: January 30, 1934, Saugerties, New York. General Orders No. 41: December 17, 1964.

Citation:

See also

List of Medal of Honor recipients for the Vietnam War

References

Further reading

External links

 

1934 births
Living people
People from Saugerties, New York
State University of New York College of Environmental Science and Forestry alumni
Members of the United States Army Special Forces
United States Army colonels
United States Army Command and General Staff College alumni
United States Army personnel of the Vietnam War
United States Army Medal of Honor recipients
Recipients of the Legion of Merit
Recipients of the National Order of Vietnam
Recipients of the Gallantry Cross (Vietnam)
Vietnam War recipients of the Medal of Honor